The Brussels Anti-Slavery Conference of 1889-1890 was held from November 18, 1889 to July 2, 1890 in Brussels and concluded with the adoption of the Brussels Conference Act of 1890 on the prohibition of slave trade and slavery in Africa by land and sea. The convention sought to strengthen the General Act of Berlin, by improving the moral and material conditions of the natives, favoring colonial policies, justified by the anti-slavery argument. However scholars argue that the event and its origins were shaped primarily by a narrow national interest. Governments paid lip-service to humanitarian goals in order to legitimize their imperial aims.

Lavigerie's crusade against slavery

During the Scramble for Africa in the mid-1880s, despite the humanitarian promises of the Berlin Colonial Conference, the colonial powers' primary concerns were territorial and economic. This was to change in 1888. In major speeches in Paris and London, Cardinal Charles Lavigerie, who had launched a crusade against slavery, denounced the horrors of the Arab slave trade. He urged immediate action in the form of an international militia of volunteers to combat the slave trade in East Africa.

Leopold II, recently king of the newly created Congo state, followed Lavigerie's preaching tour intently. he was particularly concerned by the plans to send out a private international militia. After all, this could mean the conquest of his Congo. Such an army corps, he felt, could only be justified if it was under the leadership of the Congolese government. Leopold also feared that Lavigerie, who in his previous speeches had accused Tippu Tip of slave trading, might harm the Arab policy of his Congo Free State.

After meeting Leopold, however, Lavigerie renounced an international volunteer corps. An anti-slavery expedition was now to be organised by an exclusively national anti-slavery association in consultation with the colonial authorities concerned. In his Brussels speech, although Lavigerie pointed sharply to the rampant slave trade in Congo Free State, he attributed this to a lack of resources.

Leading up to the conference
Lavigerie's preaching tour not only gave birth to the anti-slavery movement, but also the Anti-Slavery Conference was a result. European colonisation of East and Central Africa posed a number of problems, especially with the Arabo-Swahili power. A clear example was the Arabo-Swahili rebellion that led to the blockade of the east coast of Africa by Germany and Britain.

The conference

Britain, after consultation with the German government, requested Belgium to convene an international conference on the slave trade. Belgium had been specially chosen to allay Portuguese and French suspicions. On November 18, 1889, diplomats of 17 countries met in Brussels for eight intermittent months. The conference meetings took place at the Belgian Ministry of Foreign Affairs. Lambermont was appointed president of the conference. The provisions of the General Act to combat the slave trade in the African interior actually amounted to a plan for more colonialism. This was based on the reasoning that anything that contributed to the expansion of European influence should limit the scope of action of the slave traders.

The Act

The General Act of the Brussels Conference stipulated that the organisation of legal, religious and military services in African colonies and protectorates was the best means of combating the slave trade. An important item on the agenda was also the regulation of arms imports. The arms trade not only strengthened the power of the Arabo-Swahilis, but guns and ammunition were also the usual means of exchange to obtain slaves and vice versa.

To effectively combat the slave trade at sea, there had to be extensive control of shipping. Earlier in the fight against the Trans-Atlantic slave trade, England had concluded maritime treaties with a variety of nations. This allowed the English navy to examine foreign ships for transporting slaves. England sought a global agreement at the conference that would allow the right of investigation. France, however, had always opposed that right because it made England's superior maritime the police navy, The Act represented a compromise between the two positions.

Finally, the slave trade could only be completely abolished if the demand for new slaves disappeared. Thus, to eradicate the Eastern slave trade once and for all, slavery had to be abolished in the destination countries themselves. However, the conference did not go that far: only the importation of slaves was addressed. Influenced by the conference, the Ottoman Empire passed a new law that banned the import, transit and export of slaves, but left the institution of slavery untouched. Fugitive and illegally imported slaves had to be issued letters of release.

Import duties

Import duties were Leopold's primary concern. The Berlin Act had banned the levying of import duties in the Congo Basin for a period of 20 years. Now he wanted to undo this after only five years.

In a prior correspondence with England, Leopold had requested that all countries that had to incur expenses in the fight against the slave trade be allowed to levy a moderate import duty; there was no objection to this. Leopold therefore wanted this to be included in the conference programme, but Lambermont believed caution was needed. On May 10, Lambermont submitted the proposal to the conference. He requested the abolition of Article 4 of the Berlin Act and asked that the countries of the conventional Congo basin be allowed to levy an import duty of up to 10 per cent ad valorem, a ban or tax on alcohol was also considered, as it was closely linked to the slave trade. The development of public services to support trade required new revenues. Moreover, the countries, which were on the front line against the slave trade, had to be somewhat accommodated. After all, their humanitarian task cost a lot of money.

Initially, the Netherlands and the United States opposed the proposal. but after long arduous negotiations and great diplomatic skill on the part of Leopold II, both sides came to an agreement, Leopold II struck home and on July 2, the general act and declaration of the Brussels Anti-Slavery Conference could finally be signed.

Consequences 

Briefly, the conference led to the negotiation of the first treaty abolishing the Arab slave trade, the Brussels Convention, which was adopted in 1890 and entered into force on April 2, 1892. Building on the anti-slavery campaign launched by Cardinal Lavigerie in 1888 - and in line with the general act of the Berlin Conference (1884-1885) - the Brussels conference provided a powerful argument for opening up the African continent to trade and civilization through colonialism.

On 10 September 1919, the Treaty of Saint-Germain-en-Laye to revise the General Act of Berlin of 1885 and the General Act and Declaration of Brussels of 1890, extended prohibition by securing "the complete suppression of slavery in all its forms and of the slave trade by land and sea", paving the way for the UN Slavery Convention of September 25, 1926.

Participants

See also 
 1926 Slavery Convention
 Belgian Anti-Slavery Society
 Congo–Arab War
 Atrocities in the Congo Free State

External links 

 The humanitarian Action of Leopold II in Congo Free State. The Antislavery-Conference of Brussels (1889-1890)
 Conférence internationale de Bruxelles: 18 novembre 1889-2 juillet 1890, protocoles et acte final/Ministère des affaires étrangères France. Ministère des affaires étrangères (1588-2007). Auteur du texte
 General Act of Brussels (United States government version) on wikisource
Message from the President of the United States, transmitting a General act, signed at Brussels, July 2, 1890.

References

1889 in Belgium
1890 in Belgium
Abolitionism in Europe
International conferences in Belgium